Montsaunès is a commune in the Haute-Garonne department of southwestern France.

Population

In popular culture
The Templar chapel of St Christophe features in the 2013 crypto-thriller The Sword of Moses by Dominic Selwood.

See also
Communes of the Haute-Garonne department

References

Communes of Haute-Garonne